Hilliard Ensemble was a British male vocal quartet originally devoted to the performance of early music. The group was named after the Elizabethan miniaturist painter Nicholas Hilliard. Founded in 1974, the group disbanded in 2014.

Although most of its work focused on music of the Medieval and Renaissance periods, the Hilliard Ensemble also performed contemporary music, working frequently with the Estonian composer Arvo Pärt and included in its concerts works by John Cage, Gavin Bryars, Giya Kancheli, and Heinz Holliger.

History

Membership
The group was founded by Paul Hillier, Errol Girdlestone, Paul Elliott, and David James, although the membership was flexible until Hillier left in 1990. After that, the core members were David James (counter-tenor), Rogers Covey-Crump (tenor/high tenor), John Potter (tenor), and Gordon Jones (bass), except that in 1998 John Potter was replaced by Steven Harrold.

Recordings
The Hilliard Ensemble, under Paul Hillier, had an extensive discography with EMI's Reflexe early music series during the 1980s. The ensemble then recorded mainly for the ECM label. In 1994, when popular interest in Gregorian chant was at its height, the ensemble released the CD Officium, an unprecedented collaboration with the Norwegian saxophonist Jan Garbarek. The disc became one of ECM's biggest-selling releases, reaching the pop charts in several European countries and receiving five gold discs in sales. Officium's sequel, the 2-CD set Mnemosyne, followed in 1999. The third album, Officium Novum, was released in 2010. Their recordings have also been included in Craig Wright's Listening to Music textbook for music students and music appreciation.

Performances
In 2005 the ensemble took part in the Rheingau Musik Festival's composer's portrait of Arvo Pärt, together with the Rostock Motet Choir. In 2008 the Hilliard Ensemble premiered Heiner Goebbels' avant-garde staged concert I went to the house but did not enter at the 2008 Edinburgh International Festival, repeated at the Berliner Festspiele.

New music
In 2009 the ensemble premiered five new works: Guido Morini's Una Iliade, Fabio Vacchi's Memoria Italiana, Steffen Schleiermacher's Die Beschwörung der Trunkenen Oase, Simon Bainbridge's Tenebrae and Wolfgang Rihm's Et Lux. In September 2010 the Hilliard Ensemble joined the London Philharmonic Choir and Orchestra for the world premiere of Matteo D'Amico's Flight from Byzantium at the Royal Festival Hall, London.

Miscellaneous
They also performed three pieces by Guillaume Dufay: Moribus et genere, Vergene bella and Lamentatio sanctae matris ecclesiae Constantinopolitanae.

On 15 November 2010, the group appeared at Church of St. Paul the Apostle in New York to perform Kjartan Sveinsson's Cage a Swallow Can’t You but You Can’t Swallow a Cage.

Disbanding
The Hilliard Ensemble decided to disband after 41 years and gave their final concert on 20 December 2014 at the Wigmore Hall, London.

Selected discography

Harmonia Mundi
 1982: Cipriano de Rore: Le Vergine (LP, HM 1107)
 1982: Medieval English Music (HMC 901106)
 1983: Sumer is icumen in (HMC 901154)
 1983: The Singing Club (HMC 901153)

EMI Reflexe
 1980: Lionel Power: Messen und Motetten (LP, EMI Reflexe 1C 069-46 402)
 1982: John Dunstable: Motets (EMI Reflexe CDC 7 49002 2)
 1983: Josquin Desprez: Motets and chansons (EMI Reflexe CDC 7 49209 2)
 1983: Schütz: Matthäus-Passion (EMI Reflexe CDC 7 49200 2)
 1984: J. S. Bach Motets (EMI Reflexe CDC 7 49204 2) with Knabenchor Hannover
 1984: Ockeghem: Requiem; Missa Mi-Mi (EMI Reflexe CDC 7 49213 2)
 1984: Palestrina: Canticum canticorum, Spiritual madrigals (EMI Reflexe CDS 7 49010 8)
 1985: Schütz: Schwanengesang (Opus ultimum) (EMI Reflexe CDS 7 49214 8) with London Baroque and Knabenchor Hannover
 1985: Lassus: Penitential Psalms (EMI Reflexe CDS 7 49211 8) with the Kees Boeke Consort
 1986: Dufay: Missa L'Homme armé, Motets (EMI Reflexe CDC 7 47628 2)
 1987: Draw on Sweet Night - English Madrigals (EMI Reflexe CDC 7 49197 2)
 1988: Ockeghem: Missa prolationum and Marian Motets (EMI Reflexe CDC 7 49798 2)
 1989: Josquin Desprez: Missa Hercules Dux Ferrariae (EMI Reflexe CDC 7 49960 2)

Coro
 1996: Perotin and the Ars Antiqua (HL 1001)
 1996: For Ockeghem (HL 1002) music by Ockeghem, Busnois and Lupi and translated excerpts from Lament on the Death of the Late Ockeghem by Guillaume Crétin
 1997: Antoine Brumel (HL 1003)
 1998: Guillaume Dufay - Missa Se la Face ay Pale (HL 1004)

ECM
 1986: Thomas Tallis: The Lamentations of Jeremiah (ECM 1341)
 1987: Arbos (ECM 1325) with the Staatsorchester Stuttgart Brass Ensemble under Dennis Russell Davies performing works of Arvo Pärt
 1988: Passio (ECM 1370) performing works of Pärt
 1989: Perotin (ECM 1385) performing works of Perotin
 1991: Tenebrae (ECM 1422–23) performing works of Carlo Gesualdo
 1991: Miserere (ECM 1430) performing works of Pärt
 1993: The Hilliard Ensemble Sings Walter Frye (ECM 1476)
 1994: Officium (ECM 1525) with Jan Garbarek (Part 1 of the Officium-trilogy)
 1995: Codex Speciálník (ECM 1504)
 1996: A Hilliard Songbook - New Music for Voices (ECM 1614–15)
 1998: Lassus (ECM 1658) performing works of Orlande de Lassus
 1999: Mnemosyne (ECM 1700–01) with Jan Garbarek (Part 2 of the Officium-trilogy)
 2001: Morimur (ECM 1765) with Christoph Poppen
 2003: Ricercar (ECM 1774) with Christoph Poppen and Münchener Kammerorchester performing works of Bach and Webern
 2003: Tituli - Cathedral in the Thrashing Rain (ECM 1861) performing works of Stephen Hartke
 2004: Motets (ECM 2324) performing works of Guillaume de Machaut
 2005: Lamentate (ECM 1930) with Alexei Lubimov performing works of Pärt
 2007: Motetten (ECM 1875) performing works of Bach
 2008: Audivi Vocem (ECM 1936) performing works of Thomas Tallis, Christopher Tye and John Sheppard
 2010: Officium Novum (ECM 2125) with Jan Garbarek (Part 3 of the Officium-trilogy)
 2011: Song of Songs (ECM 2174) with the Rosamunde Quartett performing works of Boris Yoffe
 2012: Quinto Libro di Madrigali (ECM 2175) performing works of Gesualdo
 2013: Terje Rypdal: Melodic Warrior (ECM 2006)
 2013: Il Cor Tristo (ECM 2346) performing works of Roger Marsh, Bernardo Pisano and Jacques Arcadelt
 2014: Transeamus (ECM 2408)
 2015: Heinz Holliger: Machaut-Transkriptionen (ECM 2224) with Geneviève Strosser, Jürg Dähler and Muriel Cantoreggi
 2019: Remember me, my dear (ECM 2625) with Jan Garbarek

Other labels
 1983: Madrigals by Luca Marenzio (University of East Anglia Recordings UEA 82126)
 1988: Music from the time of Christian IV. Church Music at Court and in Town (BIS CD-389)
 1990: The Romantic Englishman (Meridian Records DUOCD 89009)
 1996: Sweet Love, Sweet Hope (Isis Records CD030)
 1997: Cristóbal de Morales: Missa Mille Regretz (Almaviva DS-0101)
 2013: Prayers and Praise. Vocal music by Alexander Raskatov (Challenge Classics CC72578)
 2016: Roger Marsh: Poor Yorick (CMRC001)
 2017: Trans Limen ad Lumen (Divox CDX-21702)
 2019: John Casken: The Dream of the Rood (NMC Recordings NMC D245) with Asko/Schönberg

References

External links
 The Hilliard Ensemble ECM
 The Hilliard Ensemble agent Hazard Chase Ltd
 The Hilliard Ensemble bach-cantatas.com
 The Hilliard Ensemble discography, medieval.org
 The Hilliard Ensemble Unofficial FanSite
 The Hilliard Ensemble (Official website) via archive.org retrieved 28 August 2015
 The Hilliard Ensemble biography by Timothy Dickey, discography and album reviews, credits & releases at AllMusic
 The Hilliard Ensemble discography, album releases & credits at Discogs
 The Hilliard Ensemble albums to be listened as stream on Spotify

British early music ensembles
Early music choirs
British choirs
ECM Records artists
Virgin Veritas artists
Musical groups established in 1974
Vocal quartets
Medieval musical groups
Erato Records artists